Jacques-Louis Battmann (25 August 1818 – 7 July 1886) was a 19th-century French organist and composer.

Life 
Born in Masevaux, Battmann was around 1840 organist in Belfort, later in Vesoul and  Dijon, where he also died. He published a total of 456 works, mainly in the field of Organ and piano music as well as sacred and secular choral works.

Selected works 
for Pipe organ/Harmonium
 Pieces d'Orgue: Entrée, Offertoire, Élévation, Communion, Sortie Opus 30, for organ
 72 Morceaux pour Orgue ou Harmonium, Opus 60
 Les Immortelles opus 440, for organ or harmonium
 Le plain chant romain harmonisé Opus 250

for Choir
 Messe No. 1 in F major, for two equal voices with organ or harmonium., Opus 143 (New edition Kleinmachnow 2014)
 Messe No. 2 in C major, Opus 282 
 Messe No. 3 in E flat major, for two equal voices with organ or harmonium, Opus 366
 Petite messe solennelle in C major, Opus 335
 Messe d’une très facile Exécution for solo and choir in unison with organ or harmonium, Opus 63

References

Bibliography 

External links 
 
 Jacques-Louis Battmann on MUSOPEN
 Noten als Datei auf DVD
 Jacques-Louis Battmann: Sanctus (Messe in F, op.143) on YouTube

French male composers
French classical organists
French male organists
19th-century French composers
Sacred music composers
1818 births
People from Haut-Rhin
1886 deaths
19th-century French male musicians
Male classical organists
19th-century organists